2-Naphthylamine is one of two isomeric aminonaphthalenes, compounds with the formula C10H7NH2. It is a colorless solid, but samples take on a reddish color in air because of oxidation. It was formerly used to make azo dyes, but it is a known carcinogen and has largely been replaced by less toxic compounds.

Preparation
2-Naphthylamine is prepared by heating 2-naphthol with ammonium zinc chloride to 200-210 °C, the Bucherer reaction. Its acetyl derivative can be obtained by heating 2-naphthol with ammonium acetate to 270-280 °C.

Reactions
It gives no color with iron(III) chloride. When reduced by sodium in boiling amyl alcohol solution, it forms tetrahydro-3-naphthylamine, which exhibits the properties of the aliphatic amines in that it is strongly alkaline in reaction, has an ammoniacal odor and cannot be diazotized.

On oxidation, it yields ortho-carboxy-hydrocinnamic acid, HO2CC6H4CH2CH2CO2H.

Numerous sulfonic acid derivatives of 2-naphthylamine are used in commerce, such as precursors to dyes.  Owing to the carcinogenicity of the amine, these derivatives are mainly prepared by amination of the corresponding naphthols. Of them, the δ-acid and Bronner's acid are of more value technically, since they combine with ortho-tetrazoditolyl to produce fine red dye-stuffs.

2-Naphthylamine was previously used as a dye precursor and rubber antioxidant in the 1930s, 40s and 50s. Dupont stopped using it in the 1970s.

Role in disease
2-Naphthylamine is found in cigarette smoke and suspected to contribute to the development of bladder cancer.

It is activated in the liver but quickly deactivated by conjugation to glucuronic acid. In the bladder, glucuronidase re-activates it by deconjugation, which leads to the development of bladder cancer.

See also
Naphthalene
Naphthol
1-Naphthylamine
1,8-Bis(dimethylamino)naphthalene

References

IARC Group 1 carcinogens
Naphthylamines
2-Naphthyl compounds